Synergy Teleconferencing System (STS) was a PC-based online chat server popular in the 1980s and 1990s. It arose as a replacement for the outdated Diversi-Dial system (DDial). Like DDial, it was a multi-line modem system that originally could handle eight simultaneous connections (later updated to handle twenty eight, and using custom-produced RS-232 serial boards had a theoretical connection limit of thirty-two on an IBM PC-AT - type computer (80286 processor).  While DDial was limited to 300 baud, STS was initially capable of 2400 baud speeds (later editions upped this to 14.4, 19.2, and 28.8).  Using internal software, one or more of these lines could be used to establish links to other STS stations, effectively making the number of simultaneous users dependent on how many STSes were involved.

The interface and design was similar to DDial in that users logged into the system with a three digit number that served as a username. Once logged in, users are allowed to change their name; the user number serves as a unique identifier. Each user was assigned a user level. 0 was for non-members.  Callers without a user number could log in for only a limited time (usually 10 minutes, but this could be decreased to 5 when call volume was high.) The numbered levels were for registered users, usually paying members. The upper levels, 50-99 were for various levels of moderators. The sysop could assign a moderator level to any user, effectively giving them power to do various tasks such as creating specialty channels, making links to other STS stations, moderating lower-level users, and kicking out people who were being a nuisance, (one early feature added was used to ban "nuisance" guests from returning after they were kicked, using the then-recently emerging technology of caller ID).

Features
Synergy Teleconferencing System also incorporated other interesting features that predated similar ones offered by larger ISPs (internet service providers); One of which (introduced early on) was the ability to inform a user that had call waiting on their phone line that they had an incoming call and allow them the opportunity to answer the call and then return to their online session.  This feature was built into the system long before other corporate service providers offered this feature.

Versions
STS was originally written in Pascal with assembly language "hooks" for driving the hardware. The earliest versions were functional on IBM PC-XT-type computers, while later versions required the more robust IBM PC-AT platform with the 80286 processor. Connection speed evolved over the life of the software; Version 2.0 of the software supported up to 28.8k directly. V1.5 and later also had a far superior network linking mode to that of Diversi-Dial that supported encrypted data communications and would use IRC as a "hub" to link multiple systems without tying up more than one phone line per station. The software was produced by the Florida company "Lightspeed Electronics LLC.", which began producing early hard disk drive systems for PCs in the early 1980s.  The primary ("flagship") station, STS-01, was called Fantasia, the successor to a D-Dial of the same name. The system was run by Falkor and the software and hardware was designed and produced by him as well as his CoSysOps Sloth, Creidiki, Troubadour and Trillian.

Current Operational Nodes

STS 07 Information Overload is back up and running currently 8 lines until we find a 486 without a riser card to support 16 lines if anyone would like to donate one they have that would be greatly appreciated!

Telnet address is 154.20.6.193 (will be adding a dyndns hostname soon and setting up a webpage with embedded telnet client) Currently down 9-19-22

STS 12 The Jungle is now operational with the 1995 user data intact.  Telnet to junglebbs.com  10-29-2022

References

https://en.wikipedia.org/w/index.php?title=Synergy_Teleconferencing_System&action=edit&section=3
Online chat